Federico Antonio Mariscal Abascal (24 September 1910 – 5 January 2002) was a Mexican diver. He competed at the 1928 Summer Olympics and the 1932 Summer Olympics. His brothers are Olympians Alonso Mariscal, Antonio Mariscal, and Diego Mariscal.

Notes

References

External links
 

1910 births
2002 deaths
Mexican male divers
Olympic divers of Mexico
Divers at the 1928 Summer Olympics
Divers at the 1932 Summer Olympics
Divers from Mexico City